Ria Thielsch (born 25 August 1951 in Manokwari, Netherlands New Guinea) is a former model and an ex-member of the Dutch girl group Luv' (who replaced Patty Brard in 1980). She was officially introduced to the public with the release of the album Forever Yours and the single My Number One (a Top 5 hit in Benelux). March 1981 saw Luv's first break-up. The trio went through lineup changes and made several comebacks. Between March 2016 and December 2018, Ria was active as a Luv' singer again. She is of Indo (Dutch-Indonesian) descent.

Early years
Ria Thielsch started her career as a model in the late 1960s. In 1978, she was a limbo dancer and singer of the Ricardo & The Flames group which recorded a single, "Trinidad", that was produced by Roy Beltman (who collaborated with the band BZN) and flopped.

Luv'
In August 1980, after a couple of years of mainstream success, Luv' experienced trouble as Patty Brard suddenly left the formation. Hans van Hemert and Piet Souer, the group's producers, had already written new material for a next album. The girls had legal obligations. Brard's departure caused InterLUV' (Luv's limited company) to lose an estimated $75.000 as many performances were cancelled. Patty was replaced by Ria Thielsch who like her had Indonesian and New Guinean origins. Ria knew Marga Scheide, the blonde singer of Luv', from modelling agencies. She was selected from 200 applicants. Though she made some appearances by performing One More Little Kissie on stage and on TV, she was presented to the media when the album Forever Yours and the single My Number One came out. These records were smash hits in Benelux. Then, Luv' was supposed to take part in the Yamaha Music Festival (officially known as the 'World Popular Song Festival') in November 1980 with the song "Be My Lover Tonight". Instead of it, Luv' cancelled their participation to this competition and performed in the Musikladen TV show in Germany.

Soon after, Marga Scheide became overworked which brought Luv' to a standstill. In March 1981, a statement announced Luv's break-up. The group made a farewell performance later, on 22 July 1981, on the Nederland Muziekland show on Veronica (TV channel) to promote the single "Tingalingaling". Finally, CNR/Carrere Records released the compilation Goodbye Luv'.

After Luv', Ria continued her modelling career until the early 1990s. She was in charge of Luv's styling in 1990 and 1991 when the group's lineup consisted of Marga Scheide, Diana van Berlo and Carina Lemoine.

In April 2003, she took part with José Hoebee in a Luv' fan club day. Six months later, she attended with José and Hans van Hemert the release party of the compilation 25 Jaar Na Waldolala. In 2013, she was present at a meet'n greet party in Eindhoven and at the release party of Luv's photo book in 2015.

In late October 2015, the media speculated about a comeback of Luv'. A German talent agency announced on its website that Marga and José could be booked as Luv' for live shows. In interviews, the ladies remained vague about plans to reactivate the group. Finally, on 16 March 2016, Marga, José and Ria announced officially their comeback in De Telegraaf, and its sister magazine Privé. Patty Brard was not involved in this reunion. Ria and Luv' toured the nostalgia circuit in the Netherlands and Belgium until 2018. On 4 January 2019, the group announced an unexpected line-up change in the Dutch media: TV personality Chimène van Oosterhout replaced Ria

Discography
Single with Ricardo & The Flames
 "Trinidad" (1979)

Singles with Luv'
 "My Number One" (CNR/Carrere Records, 1980)
 "Tingalingaling (CNR/Carrere Records, 1981)"

Album with Luv'
 Forever Yours (CNR/Carrere Records, 1980)

Compilations with Luv'
 Goodbye Luv' (CNR/Carrere Records, 1981)
 Luv' Gold (Arcade Records, 1993)
 You're the Greatest LUVer (Mercury/PolyGram Germany, 1993)
 Hollands Glorie: LUV (CNR, 2002)
 25 Jaar Na Waldolala (Universal Music, 2003)
 Completely In Luv' (Universal Music, 2006)

References

External links
 Ria Thielsch's page on the Dutch Pop Institute Website
 Blog in English about Luv'

1951 births
Living people
Dutch female models
Dutch pop singers
Dutch women singers
Dutch people of West Papuan descent
Indo people
People from Manokwari